Four Keys is an album by pianist Martial Solal with saxophonist Lee Konitz, guitarist John Scofield and bassist Niels-Henning Ørsted Pedersen recorded in West Germany in 1979 and released on the MPS label. The album was also released in the US on Pausa Records.

Critical reception

Scott Yanow of Allmusic said "An all-star quartet explores seven diverse Solal originals that range from chamberlike pieces to fairly free group improvising. The results are often exciting if cool in both tone and volume. Thoughtful yet unpredictable music".

Track listing 
All compositions by Martial Solal.

 "Brain Stream" - 6:43
 "Not Scheduled" - 7:27
 "Grapes" - 6:26
 "Retro Active" - 6:03
 "Energy" - 4:42
 "Satar" - 4:35
 "Four Keys" - 3:15

Personnel 
Martial Solal – piano
Lee Konitz – alto saxophone
John Scofield – guitar
Niels-Henning Ørsted Pedersen – bass

References 

Lee Konitz albums
Martial Solal albums
John Scofield albums
Niels-Henning Ørsted Pedersen albums
1979 albums
MPS Records albums